Parabactra is a genus of moths belonging to the subfamily Olethreutinae of the family Tortricidae.

Species
Parabactra arenosa (Meyrick, 1909)
Parabactra foederata (Meyrick, 1909)
Parabactra sociata (Meyrick, 1909)

See also
List of Tortricidae genera

References

External links
tortricidae.com

Bactrini
Tortricidae genera